John Mathiot was an American politician. He served as the fourth mayor of Lancaster, Pennsylvania from 1831 to 1843.

References

Mayors of Lancaster, Pennsylvania